Fridolfinger See is a lake in the Alpine foothills, Bavaria, Germany. Its surface area is 3 ha.

Lakes of Bavaria